Twisted Mistress is a 1942 French comedy film starring Danielle Darrieux. The movie was directed by André Cayatte, based on story by Honoré de Balzac.
It was released on VHS in France by TF1 Vidéo on 1 January 1998. It tells the story of a circus owner's daughter, who plays on a rope, sings two songs, and falls in love with local rugby player.

Main characters
Danielle Darrieux as  Lilian Rander 
Lise Delamare as Hélène Carbonnel, the wife of Guy Carbonnel
Monique Joyce as Lætitia 
Huguette Vivier as Marina 
Gabrielle Fontan as Madame Carbonnel
Jacques Dumesnil as Guy Carbonnel

Notes

External links

La fausse maîtresse at AlloCine

1942 films
French black-and-white films
Films based on works by Honoré de Balzac
Films directed by André Cayatte
Films scored by Maurice Yvain
French comedy films
1942 comedy films
1940s French-language films
Continental Films films
1940s French films